Abu El Matamir (  ) is a city in Egypt. As of 2006 it had a population of 44,415.

The city existed before the Islamic conquest of Egypt, and the Romans used it as a grain storage. The city was named by this name because wheat is stored in the past in what is called Matmur and its plural Matamir.

Etymology 
The Arabic name is from two words  "attributed"/"belonging"/father" and  "the plummets".

Climate 
Köppen climate classification system classifies its climate as hot desert (BWh).

Notable people
Mohamed Ibrahim (footballer, born 1992)

References 

Populated places in Beheira Governorate